Luiz Fabre (born 14 February 1948) is a Brazilian boxer. He competed in the men's light middleweight event at the 1964 Summer Olympics.

References

External links
 

1948 births
Living people
Brazilian male boxers
Olympic boxers of Brazil
Boxers at the 1964 Summer Olympics
Boxers at the 1967 Pan American Games
Pan American Games silver medalists for Brazil
Pan American Games medalists in boxing
Sportspeople from São Paulo
Light-middleweight boxers
Medalists at the 1967 Pan American Games
20th-century Brazilian people
21st-century Brazilian people